The Tagish are a First Nations people of Canada.

Tagish may also refer to:

Places in Canada
 Tagish, Yukon, an unincorporated community
 Tagish Highland, an upland area
 Tagish Lake, a lake

Other uses
 Tagish language, the language spoken by the Tagish people
 Tagish, a steamboat in the list of steamboats on the Yukon River

See also
 Carcross/Tagish First Nation, a First Nation of Canada in the Yukon
 Tagish Road, a highway in the Yukon of Canada
 Tagish Lake (meteorite), a meteorite that fell in the Tagish Lake area, British Columbia, Canada
 Tagish Charlie (ca. 1865–1908), Canadian Tagish/Tlingit First Nation gold co-discoverer